Nothing But Lies is a 1991 French-Swiss drama film directed by Paule Muret. It was entered into the 42nd Berlin International Film Festival.

Cast
 Fanny Ardant as Muriel
 Alain Bashung as Adrien
 Jacques Perrin as Antoine, mari de Muriel
 Stanislas Carré de Malberg as Basile
 Christine Pascal as Lise
 Alexandra Kazan as Jo
 Jean-Pierre Malo
 Dominique Besnehard as Détective

References

External links

1991 films
1991 drama films
1990s French-language films
French drama films
Swiss drama films
French-language Swiss films
1990s French films